Poplar Grove is an unincorporated community and census-designated place (CDP) in Phillips County, Arkansas, United States, located on U.S. Route 49 between Marvell and West Helena. It was first listed as a CDP in the 2020 census with a population of 215.

Poplar Grove is a farming community surrounded by fields.

Education
The Barton–Lexa School District provides early childhood, elementary and secondary education to more than 800 students in prekindergarten through grade 12 in two schools. Students complete their studies at Barton High School.

Demographics

2020 census

Note: the US Census treats Hispanic/Latino as an ethnic category. This table excludes Latinos from the racial categories and assigns them to a separate category. Hispanics/Latinos can be of any race.

Notable residents
Solomon Harper, inventor

References

External links

Unincorporated communities in Arkansas
Unincorporated communities in Phillips County, Arkansas
Census-designated places in Arkansas
Census-designated places in Phillips County, Arkansas